Linda Lundström, O.Ont., (born 1951) is a Canadian fashion designer.

Life and career 
Lundström was born in Red Lake, Ontario and raised in the nearby hamlet of Cochenour. When she was a child, her mother bought her a sewing machine, and she learned to make clothes for herself and her friends. She studied fashion at Sheridan College in Oakville before receiving a scholarship to travel to Europe to continue her studies.

Upon her return, she started a fashion design business in Toronto, Ontario in 1974. Her recognizable line of outerwear, clothing and accessories was sold in three flagship boutiques in addition to top retailers across North America and Europe, including Hudson's Bay Company and Nordstrom. She is most well known for the LAPARKA, a fashionable winter coat. She is the recipient of numerous awards, including three honorary Ph.Ds. She was named to the Order of Ontario in 1995, and the Queen Elizabeth II Diamond Jubilee Medal in 2013. She is recognized as a champion of First Nations awareness and ethical manufacturing practices.

The economic downturn of 2007 forced her to file for protection from bankruptcy in January 2008. After her business was acquired by private investment firm Elgner Group, she was able to start designing again but resigned after 17 months, and in 2012, Lundström introduced a new fashion line called "L designed by Linda Lundström".

In 2016, Lundström, along with her two daughters Mosha Lundström Halbert and Sophie Lundström Halbert, launched Therma Kota, a new outerwear brand.

References

Living people
Canadian fashion designers
Canadian women fashion designers
Members of the Order of Ontario
People from Red Lake, Ontario
1952 births